Neufahrn (b Freising) station is located in the town of Neufahrn bei Freising in the German state of Bavaria and is served by  the Munich S-Bahn.

So line  services are coupled or uncoupled at Neufahrn station. Usually the rear section of the train goes to Munich Airport Terminal station and the front section goes to Freising station. The station has a side platform as platform 1 and a central platform between platform tracks 2 and 3. Trains are uncoupled to run towards Freising and the Airport on platform 1. Trains running towards Munich East station are coupled mainly on track 3, although some are coupled on track 2. The side platform is designed as the “home” platform (next to the station building), which can be reached by ramps from both ends of the station from Bahnhofstraße (station street) or from a footpath. The central platform is accessible through underpasses at both ends, with the underpass located at the western end having ramps to the station forecourt (Bahnhofsplatz) and to Massenhauser Straße and a lift to the platform. Bahnhofstrasse also has P & R parking. A connection to the airport with a flyover was built north of the station. The previously unused home platform was also rebuilt and installed with new points, which are designed for 100 km/h. The home platform is 210 metres long and 96 cm high. The platform for tracks 2 and 3 is 210 metres long, but only 76 cm high.

References

External links

Munich S-Bahn stations
Railway stations in Germany opened in 1880
Buildings and structures in Freising (district)